The Big Push Model is a concept in development economics or welfare economics that emphasizes the fact that a firm's decision whether to industrialize or not depends on the expectation of what other firms will do. It assumes economies of scale and oligopolistic market structure. It also explain when the industrialization would happen.

The major contribution the concept of the Big Push were made by Paul Rosenstein-Rodan in 1943 and later on by Murphy, Shleifer and Vishny in 1989. Also some contribution of Matsuyama (1992), Krugman (1991) and Romer (1986) proved to be seminal for later literature on the Big Push.

Analysis of this economic model usually involves using game theory.

The hallmark of the ‘big-push’ approach lies in the reaping of external economies through the simultaneous installation of a host of technically interdependent industries. But before that could become possible, we have to overcome the economic indivisibilities by moving forward by a certain “minimum indivisible step”. This can be realised through the injection of an initial big dose of a certain size of investment

See also

Rostow's stages of growth
Ragnar Nurkse
Ragnar Nurkse's balanced growth theory
Virtuous circle and vicious circle
Strategy of unbalanced growth
Dual economy

References
P Krugman, 1991: History vs Expectation. The Quarterly Journal of Economics
P Krugman, 1992: Toward a counter-counterrevolution in development theory. Proceedings of the World Bank Annual Conference on Development Economics
K Matsuyama, 1992: The market size, Entrepreneurship, and the Big Push. Stanford
KM Murphy, A Shleifer, RW Vishny, 1989: Industrialization and the Big Push. The Journal of Political Economy Vol. 97, pp. 1003-1026 

PN Rosenstein-Rodan, 1943: The Problems of Industrialisation of Eastern and South-Eastern Europe. The Economic Journal Vol.53
R Nelson, 1956: A Theory of the Low-Level Equilibrium Trap in Underdeveloped Economies. American Economic Review Vol. 46(5), pp. 894-908
UN Millennium Project, 2005: Investing in Development: A Practical Plan to Achieve the Millennium Development Goals. New York: United Nations

External links 
 http://monthlyreview.org/2006/05/01/the-neoliberal-rebirth-of-development-economics
 https://web.archive.org/web/20110808035619/http://are.berkeley.edu/~adelman/WORLDEV.html

Economics models